This article lists the main target shooting events and their results for 2010.

World Events

International Shooting Sport Federation

ISSF World Shooting Championships
 July 29 - August 10: 2010 ISSF World Shooting Championships held in Munich, Germany.

ISSF World Cup
 2010 ISSF World Cup

FITASC
2010 Results

2010 Summer Youth Olympics
 August 22-25: Shooting at the 2010 Summer Youth Olympics held at the Singapore Sports School.

Commonwealth Games
 October 9-13: Shooting at the 2010 Commonwealth Games held at the Dr. Karni Singh Shooting Range in Delhi, India

 February 19-27: 2010 Commonwealth Shooting Championships served as the test event for the Commonwealth Games later in the year

Regional Events

Americas

Central American and Caribbean Games
 July 18-25: Shooting at the 2010 Central American and Caribbean Games held in Mayaguez, Puerto Rico.

Shooting Championships of the Americas
 2010 Shooting Championships of the Americas, Rio de Janeiro, Brazil

South American Games
 March 20-26: Shooting at the 2010 South American Games

Asia

Asian Shooting Championships
 March 27 - April 6: 2010 Asian Clay Shooting Championships held in Bangkok, Thailand

Asian Games
 November 13-24: Shooting at the 2010 Asian Games held in Guangzhou, China.

Europe

European Shooting Confederation
 March 6-14: 2010 European 10 m Events Championships held in Meråker, Norway.
 2010 European Shotgun Championships held in Kazan, Russia.

National Events

United Kingdom

NRA Imperial Meeting
 July, held at the National Shooting Centre, Bisley
 Queen's Prize winner: 
 Grand Aggregate winner: DC Luckman
 Ashburton Shield winners: Epsom College
 Kolapore Winners: 
 National Trophy Winners: 
 Elcho Shield winners: 
 Vizianagram winners: House of Commons

NSRA National Meeting
 August, held at the National Shooting Centre, Bisley
 Earl Roberts British Prone Champion:

USA
 2010 NCAA Rifle Championships, won by Alaska Nanooks

References

 
2010 in sports